The Desert Empire League is an American high school sports league in the Coachella Valley of Riverside County, California affiliated with the CIF Southern Section.  It was formed for the 2019 season.

Teams in the league include:

La Quinta High School Blackhawks
Palm Desert High School Aztecs
Palm Springs High School Indians
Rancho Mirage High School Rattlers
Shadow Hills High School Knights
Xavier College Preparatory High School Saints

References

CIF Southern Section leagues
Coachella Valley
Sports in Riverside County, California